Christ Church  is a former Church of England church on Kew Road in  Richmond, in the London Borough of Richmond upon Thames. Its architect was Arthur Blomfield who, thirty years earlier, had designed another Anglican church of the same name in neighbouring East Sheen.

The church building opened in 1894, the congregation's founding members being 1,300 Anglican members of St John the Divine, Richmond who objected to St John's moving away from an Evangelical style of worship and towards a more Catholic direction. They had left St John's in the 1870s and started worshipping at an iron church on Park Lane, Richmond that had previously been used by the Baptist congregation of  Duke Street Church prior to the opening of its own church building in 1870.

The foundation stone of the new building was laid by HRH Mary, Duchess of Teck. The church's first vicar, from 1893 to 1908, was the Rev. Alfred Ernest Foster, who had been priest-in-charge at the  temporary iron church since 1891.

A large hall was built at the back of the church in 1895–96.

The church closed in 1986, the congregation having merged with that of Holy Trinity Church,  Sheen Park, Richmond, in 1977. The building has been converted into 15 residential flats.

References

Sources

1894 establishments in England
1986 disestablishments in England
Arthur Blomfield church buildings
Churches completed in 1864
Former churches in the London Borough of Richmond upon Thames
Former Church of England church buildings
Richmond, London